D.I.R.T. (Da Incredible Rap Team) is the third and final studio album by American hip hop duo Heltah Skeltah. It was released on September 30, 2008 via Duck Down Music, making it their first album in ten years since the release of Magnum Force in 1998.

Production was handled by Illmind, Khrysis, Stu Bangas, 10 For The Triad, Deric "D-Dot" Angelettie, Double Up, Evidence, Marco Polo, M-Phazes, Sic Beats and Soul Theory, with Buckshot and Drew "Dru-Ha" Friedman serving as executive producers. It features guest appearances from Buckshot, Flood, Representativz, Ruste Juxx and Smif-N-Wessun.

The album did not receive as much critical acclaim and underground success as their previous albums, reaching number 122 on the US Billboard 200, number 35 on the Top R&B/Hip-Hop Albums and number 21 on the Independent Albums.

Music videos were released for "Everything Is Heltah Skeltah" and "Ruck N Roll".

Track listing

Charts

References

External links

2008 albums
Heltah Skeltah albums
Duck Down Music albums
Albums produced by D-Dot
Albums produced by Illmind
Albums produced by Khrysis
Albums produced by M-Phazes
Albums produced by Marco Polo
Albums produced by Evidence (musician)